Gabrielius Landsbergis (born 7 January 1982 in Vilnius) is a Lithuanian politician, Minister of Foreign Affairs in the 18th Government of the Republic of Lithuania led by the Prime Minister Ingrida Šimonytė. He is a Member of the Seimas for Centras – Žaliakalnis constituency, and a former member of the European Parliament. He was a member of Group of the European People's Party (Christian Democrats). Landsbergis was elected as the Chairman of the Homeland Union in 2015. He is credited with modernising Homeland Union.

On 11 December 2020, he was approved to be the Minister of Foreign Affairs in the Šimonytė Cabinet.

Biography

Gabrielus Landsbergis was born in Vilnius, the 7th of January 1982. He is the grandson of the leader of Lithuania after gaining independence from the Soviet Union, Vytautas Landsbergis.
Vytautas Landsbergis was the founder of the Lithuanian independence movement and organisation “Sąjūdis”.

In 2003, Landsbergis graduated from the Faculty of History, Vilnius University and gained a bachelor's degree; in 2005, he graduated from Vilnius University Institute of International Relations and Political Science, gaining a master's degree in International Relations and Diplomacy. He worked in the Ministry of Foreign Affairs of Lithuania and the Chancellery of the President of Lithuania. In 2007 he joined the staff of the Lithuanian embassy in the Kingdom of Belgium and to the Grand Duchy of Luxembourg. Landsbergis returned to Lithuania in 2011 and worked in the Chancellery of the Government of Lithuania. Landsbergis speaks Lithuanian (native) and English.

Member of the European Parliament (2014–2016)

On 8 January 2014, Landsbergis was selected as leading candidate for the Homeland Union's list in 2014 European Parliament election, and was a Member of the European Parliament between 2014 and 2016.

Landsbergis served on the Committee on International Trade and on the Subcommittee on Security and Defence. In addition to his committee assignments, he was a member of the European Parliament Intergroup on Children's Rights.

On 25 April 2015, Landsbergis was elected as Chairman of the Homeland Union, defeating former speaker of the Seimas Irena Degutienė in the contest.

When Landsbergis asked to meet with Russian MPs and officials in Moscow amid the Ukraine crisis of 2013-15, his request was denied.

Member of Government  (since 2016)

In November 2015, Landsbergis was selected to stand in Žaliakalnis single-member constituency to the upcoming parliamentary election. Due to the redrawing of single-member constituencies' boundaries, Landsbergis was proposed to the newly established Centras–Žaliakalnis single-member constituency (Centras single-member constituency candidate Gintarė Skaistė joined the multi-member list instead).

By March 2016, Landsbergis resigned from the European Parliament. In the 2016 parliamentary elections, Landsbergis was the only Homeland Union's candidate to win single-member constituency in Kaunas. After these elections, Landsbergis proposed to hold a leadership election, which he won.

Personal life
Landsbergis' father is Vytautas V. Landsbergis, a Lithuanian writer, and his mother is Giedrė Bukelytė. Gabrielius is the grandson of Vytautas Landsbergis, a prominent Lithuanian politician, who was one of the founders of Sąjudis and the Chairman of the Reconstituent Seimas of Lithuania after its independence declaration from the Soviet Union.

He is married to Austėja Landsbergienė (née Čijauskaitė). The couple has four children.

Honors
 Order of Prince Yaroslav the Wise, 3rd class (Ukraine, 23 August 2022)

References

External links

 Homepage

1982 births
Living people
Vilnius University alumni
Lithuanian people of German descent
Homeland Union MEPs
MEPs for Lithuania 2014–2019
Politicians from Vilnius
Ministers of Foreign Affairs of Lithuania
Recipients of the Order of Prince Yaroslav the Wise, 3rd class
Gabrielius Landsbergis